Warminster railway station serves the town of Warminster in Wiltshire, England.

The station is operated by Great Western Railway and is a main station on the Wessex Main Line, with regular services to Bristol, Cardiff, Southampton and Portsmouth.

History
The station was opened by the Great Western Railway on 9 September 1851, as the terminus of its branch from Westbury on its Wilts, Somerset and Weymouth route.  The branch was extended to Salisbury on 30 June 1856.  The station was originally provided with a train shed covering the tracks and platforms, but this was removed around 1930 when the current canopies were erected in its place.  The original wooden buildings were retained and are still in use today.

Services

A few additional GWR trains call at certain hours (some of which either originate or terminate here).

Connections 
Once a year, a bus service (colloquially known as route 23A) runs from Warminster station to the uninhabited village of Imber.

References

Former Great Western Railway stations
Railway stations in Great Britain opened in 1851
Railway stations in Wiltshire
Railway stations served by Great Western Railway
Railway station
Railway stations served by South Western Railway
DfT Category E stations